Sergey Chikishev (born 29 July 1984) is a Kyrgyzstani footballer who plays as a defender.

Career statistics

International

Statistics accurate as of match played 21 February 2010

International goals
Score and Result lists Kyrgyzstan goals first

Honours
Dordoi-Dynamo Naryn
Kyrgyzstan League (3): 2005, 2006, 2007
Kyrgyzstan Cup (2): 2005, 2006

References

External links
 

1984 births
Living people
Kyrgyzstani people of Russian descent
Kyrgyzstani footballers
Kyrgyzstan international footballers
Footballers at the 2006 Asian Games
Association football defenders
Asian Games competitors for Kyrgyzstan